is an adventure game released in 1993 on Mega-CD. The game was developed by Riot and released by Telenet. The game's cover art was created by Yasushi Nirasawa, in his position as a model-builder for Hobby Japan magazine.

Gameplay 
The game is an RPG adventure game consisting of four stages.

Reception 
The Japanese magazine Famitsu gave it a score of 22 out of 40.

References

External links 
 A-Rank Thunder Tanjouhen at Guardiana.net

1993 video games
Adventure games
Japan-exclusive video games
Sega CD games
Sega CD-only games
Video games developed in Japan